Moai are large statues of Easter Island.

Moai also may refer to:
 Moai (seamount), submarine volcano type
 Moai kavakava, small wooden statues
 Moai (game development platform)
 Moai (social support groups), Japanese institution

See also 
 Moa (disambiguation)
 MAOI, antidepressant medications 
 Maui, Hawaiian island